Oh Ji-hwan (Hangul: 오지환, Hanja: 吳志煥; born March 12, 1990, in Gunsan, Jeollabuk-do) is a South Korean shortstop who plays for the LG Twins in the KBO League. He bats left-handed and throws right-handed.

Amateur career
While attending Kyunggi High School in Seoul, Oh was considered one of the top shortstop prospects in the Korean high school baseball league along with An Chi-hong. Oh was also a power pitcher who occupied the No. 1 spot in the starting rotation of his team.

In 2008, he was selected for the South Korea national junior baseball team to compete at the World Junior Baseball Championship, where they claimed their fifth tournament title. Oh played in all eight games for the team as an infielder, designated hitter and relief pitcher, and was named to the All-Star tournament team as a designated hitter.

Professional career
Oh was drafted by the LG Twins in the first round of the 2009 KBO Draft and made his pro debut on September 12, 2009. He had one at-bat as a pinch hitter in that game, striking out swinging to SK Wyverns pitcher Gary Glover in the top of the seventh inning. He appeared in only five games with the Twins in 2009, getting one hit and striking out five times in nine at-bats.

On March 27, 2010, Oh hit his first professional league home run off Yoon Sung-hwan in the 2010 KBO Opening Day game, going 2-for-4 and driving in three runs in a 7–5 win over the Samsung Lions. During the 2010 season, Oh was impressive enough to earn the starting shortstop job for the Twins over another candidates. He led the league in strikeouts with 137 but drove in 61 runs, the most in team history by a shortstop for a single season, and hit 13 home runs, the most among the starting shortstops in the league.

International career
After the 2010 season, Oh was selected for the South Korea national baseball team to compete in the Intercontinental Cup held in Taichung.

In 2018, he represented South Korea at the 2018 Asian Games.

References

External links 
 Career statistics and player information from the KBO League 

1990 births
Living people
Baseball players at the 2018 Asian Games
Baseball players at the 2020 Summer Olympics
Asian Games gold medalists for South Korea
Medalists at the 2018 Asian Games
Asian Games medalists in baseball
KBO League shortstops
Kyunggi High School alumni
LG Twins players
People from Gunsan
South Korean baseball players
Olympic baseball players of South Korea
Sportspeople from North Jeolla Province
2023 World Baseball Classic players